Ingrid Pelicori (born 13 January 1957) is an Argentine actress. She is best known for playing Ana Graziani in the El Trece telenovela Farsantes.

Awards

Nominations
 2007 Martín Fierro Awards
 Best Supporting Actress, on El Rafa
 2014 Martín Fierro Awards
 Best Actress in a Movie or Miniseries, on Historias de corazón

References

External links

Argentine actresses
Living people
1957 births